1205 km is a rural locality (a village) in Voyegurtskoye Rural Settlement of Balezinsky District, Russia. The population was 25 as of 2008.

Geography 
The village is located on the Kep River.

Streets 
There are no named streets.

References 

Rural localities in Udmurtia